In probability theory, the general form of Bienaymé's identity states that
.

This can be simplified if  are pairwise independent, integrable random variables, each with finite second moment. This simplification gives:

.

Bienaymé's identity may be used in proving certain variants of the law of large numbers.

See also 
Propagation of error
Markov chain central limit theorem

References 

Algebra of random variables